Tollesbury railway station was on the Kelvedon and Tollesbury Light Railway, serving the village of Tollesbury, Essex.

The station was opened in 1904 by the Great Eastern Railway.

It was closed, along with the rest of the line, on 7 May 1951.

References

External links
 Tollesbury station on navigable 1945 O. S. map

Disused railway stations in Essex
Former Great Eastern Railway stations
Railway stations in Great Britain opened in 1904
Railway stations in Great Britain closed in 1951